Agathidinae is a subfamily of braconid parasitoid wasps. Some species have been used in biological control programs.

Description and distribution 
Agathidines are among the larger and more colorful braconids. Diurnal members of this subfamily often possess aposematic coloration. They belong to the noncyclostome group.

They are found worldwide, but are more diverse in the tropics.

Biology 
All Agathidinae are koinobiont endoparasitoids of caterpillars. Most attack concealed caterpillars, such as those that use silk to tie leaves together. Most are solitary, laying only one egg in each host caterpillar. Some species are nocturnal, with pale coloration and large ocelli.

Genera 
Genera placed here include:

 Agathirsia
 Agathis
 Aerophilus
 Alabagrus
 Amputoearinus
 Aneurobracon (formerly in Orgilinae)
 Austroearinus
 Bassus (polyphyletic)
 Balcenema
 Biroia
 Braunsia
 Coccygidium
 Crassomicrodus
 Cremnops Foerster, 1862
 Cremnoptoides
 Disophrys
 Earinus
 Euagathis
 Facilagathis
 Gyrochus
 Hemichoma
 Holcotroticus
 Hypsostypos
 Liopisa
 Lytopylus
 Macroagathis Szépligeti, 1908
 Marjoriella
 Mesocoelus (formerly in Orgilinae)
 Monophrys
 Oreba
 Pelmagathis
 Platyagathis
 Protroticus van Achterberg, 1988
 Pseudocremnops
 Sesioctonus
 Troticus Brullé, 1846
 Zacremnops
 Zamicrodus
 Zelomorpha

References

External links 
 Photos on BugGuide
 DNA barcodes at BOLD systems

Braconidae
Apocrita subfamilies